The Judo competition in the 1986 Goodwill Games were held in Moscow, Soviet Union from 17  to 21 July 1986.

Medal overview

Medals table

External links
Result of the Judo at the 1986 Goodwill Games (Goodwill Games)
Preliminaries and Quarterfinals by UPI
Semifinals by UPI
Finals by UPI

1986 Goodwill Games
1986
Goodwill Games
Judo competitions in Russia